Stoyanka Angelova (born 28 March 1928) is a Bulgarian gymnast. She competed in seven events at the 1952 Summer Olympics.

References

External links

1928 births
Possibly living people
Bulgarian female artistic gymnasts
Olympic gymnasts of Bulgaria
Gymnasts at the 1952 Summer Olympics